Charaxes lydiae is a butterfly in the family Nymphalidae. It is found in Cameroon, Gabon and the Republic of the Congo.

Description
The antennae are black. The  front  and  head  are  black,  with  a  minute  white  spot  be- fore and  behind  the  insertion  of  each  antenna. The  upper  side  of the  thorax  is  clothed  with  whitish  gray  hairs,  the  upper  side  of  the abdomen  is  whitish,  with  the  hind  edges  of  the  six  posterior  segments marked  with  black. The  pectus  and  lower  side  of  the  abdomen  are white. Upper  side  of  wings: The  fore  wing  at  the  base  is  densely  clothed  with  glaucous  gray scales  as  far  as  the  middle  of  the  cell,  but  through  this  vestiture  the dark  markings  at  the  base  of  the  cell  on  the  lower  side  faintly  appear. A  broad  white  triangular  area,  extends  upward  from the  inner  three-fourths  of  the  margin  to  the  origin  of  vein  3,  but does  not  reach  the  outer  angle. At  the  outer  angle  is  a  triangular  white  spot. Above this  spot,  between  the  extremities  of  veins  2  and  3,  there  is  a  lanceolate spot,  with  its  apex  pointing  inwardly. Above  vein  5  and  a  little  beyond  the  last  mentioned  white spot  there  is  a  band  of  white  running  inwardly  and  upwardly  to  the costa,  narrowing  from  vein  5  as  it  approaches  the  costal  margin. There  are  three  smaller  white  spots,  forming  a  subapical  band,  located on  the  fifth,  sixth,  and  seventh  interspaces. The  hind  wing  is  tailed  at  the  extremity  of  the  first  and  second  median nervules  (veins  2  and  4). The  outer  border  is  broadly  black,  each interspace  ornamented  with  a  more  or  less  oval  white  submarginal spot,  except  at  the  inner  angle,  where  there  are  two  such  spots  in  the interspace  between  the  extremities  of  the  inner  vein  and  the  first median  nervule. Expanse,  as  spread,  90  mm. Holland, W.J. 1917. Two new West African Rhopalocera. Annales of the Carnegie Museum 11: 14-18.

Biology
The habitat consists of primary forests (the Congolian forests).Darge (1973) gives an account of the biology of lydiae

Taxonomy
Charaxes lydiae is the sole member of the Charaxes lydiae species group.

Etymology

References

Victor Gurney Logan Van Someren, 1974 Revisional notes on African Charaxes (Lepidoptera: Nymphalidae). Part IX. Bulletin of the British Museum of Natural History (Entomology) 29 (8):415-487.

External links
Charaxes.be/systematic African Charaxes/Charaxes Africains, Eric Vingerhoedt
Charaxes lydiae images at Consortium for the Barcode of Life

Butterflies described in 1917
lydiae
Butterflies of Africa
Taxa named by William Jacob Holland